Virgibacillus campisalis is a Gram-variable, endospore-forming, rod-shaped and motile  bacterium from the genus of Virgibacillus which has been isolated from sediments from a marine solar saltern from the west coast of Korea.

References

Bacillaceae
Bacteria described in 2012